Anna Huber is a model from Austria.

She has appeared in numerous ads such as Azzaro 'Visit' fragrance,  Canderel,  Calzedonia,  Damier Azur,  Daniel Swarovski,  Devernois,  House of Fraser,  Hugo Boss 'Intense Shimmer' fragrance,  John Galliano,  Kérastase,  Laura Biagotti,  Lavazza,  Linea,  Liska,  Marks & Spencer,  Naf Naf,  Nannini,  Nina Ricci, and others.

References

Living people
Austrian female models
Year of birth missing (living people)